Arbatskaya Square or Arbat Square is one of the oldest squares of Moscow, located on the junction of Gogolevsky Boulevard, Znamenka Street and Arbat Gates Square (in 1925–1993 – part of Arbatskaya Square).

The square is home to the Arbatskaya metro station, on Filyovskaya Line.

Present-day square is dominated by the wide avenue of New Arbat, however, prior to redevelopment of the 1960s, the square was located south from this avenue, on the line of Arbat Street and the vestibule of Arbatskaya subway station. Arbat Gates of Bely Gorod were located here; the wall of Bely Gorod was demolished in the 1750s-1770s, the tower in 1792, creating the original Arbat Gates Square. 

There was no straight connection between Vozdvizhenka and Arbat: westbound coaches had to make a sharp turn south into Nikitsky Boulevard, past a corner block on this boulevard, then make a turn west into either Arbat, Povarskaya Street, Bolshaya Molchanovka, Malaya Molchanovka or Merzlyakovsky Lane. All these four streets fanned out west from the square. In 1807–1812, it hosted , which perished in the Fire of Moscow (1812), as well as most of the neighborhoods around it.

The Arbat Fountain, originally a fire reservoir (1840s), later a decorative fountain, was located in the south of the square, on the line of Maly Afanasyevsky Lane. In 1945, it was refitted with sculptures and granite slabs in stalinist style, only to be destroyed in the 1960s.

Squares in Moscow
Arbat District